Jufain Al-Bishi (born 1 May 1987) is a Saudi Arabian footballer who plays .

Honours

Al-Ahli (Jeddah)
Crown Prince Cup: 2007
Saudi Federation cup: 2007
Gulf Club Champions Cup: 2008
Kings Cup: 2011, 2012

National Team U-23
Gulf Cup of Nations Under 23: 2008

References

External links

Jufain Al-Bishi at Footballdatabase

Living people
1987 births
Saudi Arabian footballers
Bisha FC players
Al-Ahli Saudi FC players
Al-Raed FC players
Al-Taawoun FC players
Ohod Club players
Sportspeople from Jeddah
Saudi Professional League players
Association football defenders
Saudi Arabia international footballers